Izabelle Leite (born 1 September 1990) is a Brazilian actress and model.
She works predominantly in the Indian film industry.

Career
After debuting in Bollywood with an uncredited appearance in Talaash: The Answer Lies Within, she appeared in Bollywood with a leading role in the teen drama Sixteen (2013). Her second film was the romance Purani Jeans (2014). As a model, she has promoted Lakme beauty products, Procter & Gamble, Big Bazaar and the Pakistani brand Nishat Linen.
Leite was nominated for Best Female Debut Actress by Life Ok Screen Awards 2014 for the movie Sixteen. She also appeared in the music video of Lahore with Guru Randhawa which has reached over 900 million views on YouTube.

Filmography

References

External links

 
 

Living people
1993 births
People from João Pessoa, Paraíba
Brazilian film actresses
Brazilian female models
Brazilian expatriate actresses in India
Actresses in Hindi cinema
Actresses in Telugu cinema
21st-century Brazilian actresses